"Church of the Poison Mind" is a 1983 hit single by the British new wave band Culture Club. It was released as the lead single from their second, and most successful, album Colour by Numbers.

The song reached #2 in the United Kingdom, being kept out of the top spot by David Bowie's "Let's Dance". It was also the band's fourth Top 10 hit in Canada and the United States. In America, it was still climbing the charts when "Karma Chameleon" was released as a single. This prompted Epic Records to release "Karma" ahead of schedule.

"Church of the Poison Mind" actually reached its peak position the same week "Karma Chameleon" debuted on the US charts. In many countries its B-side was the heavily percussive street song "Man Shake" and in some others, such as the United States, it was the song "Mystery Boy". Both songs were on the 12-inch single in many countries, except Canada, where it was issued with an extended version of previous hit "I'll Tumble 4 Ya".

Background
Helen Terry sang backing vocals on the song. AllMusic critic Stewart Mason stated that her "fiery performance of the chorus is a pop-song masterstroke."  Fellow Allmusic critic Jose J. Promis agreed that her performance "really brought the house down."
Mason regarded the song as a tribute to the songs written by Holland–Dozier–Holland for Motown in the 1960s. It was ranked at number 8 among the top ten "Tracks of the Year" for 1983 by NME. In 2017, it was ranked as the number one Culture Club song by Billboard.

In an interview with Rolling Stone in June 1984, Bob Dylan, when asked if he belonged to any church, joked that he adhered to the "Church of the Poison Mind".

Track listing

7-inch record 
A. "Church of the Poison Mind"
B. "Man Shake"

(Released in UK, Canada, Australia, France, Germany, Italy, Japan, Netherlands, Portugal, Sweden)

A. "Church of the Poison Mind"
B. "Mystery Boy"

(Released in Peru, USA.)

12-inch record 
A. "Church of the Poison Mind"
B1. "Mystery Boy"
B2. "Man Shake"

(Released at least in UK, Australia, Germany, Greece (different cover), Italy, Mexico.)

A. "Church of the Poison Mind"
B. "I'll Tumble 4 Ya" (extended dance mix)

(Released in Canada.)

Charts

Weekly charts

Year-end charts

References

1983 singles
Culture Club songs
1983 songs
Song recordings produced by Steve Levine
Virgin Records singles
Epic Records singles
Songs written by Boy George
Songs written by Roy Hay (musician)
Songs written by Mikey Craig
Songs written by Jon Moss